Tun Muhammad Ghazali bin Shafie (22 March 1922 – 24 January 2010) was a Malaysian politician and diplomat. He served under the administrations of four Prime Ministers, most notably as Minister of Home and Foreign Affairs from 1973 to 1984.

Biography
Ghazali was born in 1922 in Kuala Lipis, Pahang. He was of Minangkabau descent from Rao, West Sumatra. He was part of the clandestine resistance to the Japanese occupation of Malaya in World War II. He then studied at the University of Wales and the London School of Economics.

During the Malayan Emergency, Ghazali fully supported British military attempts to crush a pro-independence uprising led by the Malayan National Liberation Army (MNLA), the armed wing of the Malayan Communist Party (MCP). Writing in The Times newspaper, Ghazali openly supported the killing and public display of the corpses of people suspected to have been members of the MNLA.

After a career in the civil service, Ghazali entered politics.  He served as Home and Information Minister from 1973 to 1981, and was then appointed as Foreign Minister until 1984. He represented the Parliamentary seat of Lipis from 1974, before which he was a member of the Dewan Negara (upper house of parliament). As Foreign Minister, he was known for his role in ASEAN's diplomacy in respect of conflict in Cambodia. Described as a "flamboyant politician", his nickname was "King Ghaz".

On 11 January 1982, Ghazali survived an aeroplane crash in which he was the pilot. His bodyguard and co-pilot were killed.  There had been reports (for example in the New York Times) that Ghazali had been killed in the crash.  A coroner later blamed the accident on what the coroner found to be Ghazali's negligence.

After leaving politics, he held a range of positions in the corporate sector and with international organisations.

Ghazali died on 24 January 2010 at 7.45pm, at his home in Subang Jaya. His wife, Toh Puan Khatijah Abdul Majid, died in April 2008. They are survived by his two sons, Bachtiar and Sheriffudin. He was buried at Makam Pahlawan, Masjid Negara, Kuala Lumpur.

Election results

Honours

Honours of Malaysia
  :
  Recipient of the Malaysian Commemorative Medal (Gold) (PPM) (1965)
  Commander of the Order of the Defender of the Realm (PMN) – Tan Sri (1965)
  Grand Commander of the Order of Loyalty to the Crown of Malaysia (SSM) – Tun (2005)
  :
 Companion of the Order of the Crown of Pahang (SMP) (1968)
  Knight Companion of the Order of the Crown of Pahang (DIMP) – Dato' (1970)
  Grand Knight of the Order of the Crown of Pahang (SIMP) –  formerly Dato', now Dato' Indera (1972)
  Grand Knight of the Order of Sultan Ahmad Shah of Pahang (SSAP) – Dato' Sri
  :
  Knight Grand Companion of the Order of Sultan Salahuddin Abdul Aziz Shah (SSSA) – Dato' Seri (1985)
  :
  Grand Commander of the Order of Kinabalu (SPDK) – Datuk Seri Panglima
  :
  Knight Commander of the Order of the Star of Hornbill Sarawak (DA) – Datuk Amar (1988)

Foreign Honours
 :
 Grand Officer of the National Order of Vietnam (1965)

Places named after him
 MRSM Tun Ghazali Shafie, a MARA institutional boarding school in Kuala Lipis, Pahang
 Ghazali Shafie Graduate School Research Institute, Universiti Utara Malaysia, Kedah
 Ghazali Shafie Graduate School of Government, Universiti Utara Malaysia, Kedah

References

1922 births
2010 deaths
People from Pahang
Alumni of the London School of Economics
Alumni of the University of Wales
Foreign ministers of Malaysia
Home ministers of Malaysia
Information ministers of Malaysia
Malaysian people of Malay descent
Malaysian Muslims
Malaysian people of Minangkabau descent
United Malays National Organisation politicians
Knights Commander of the Order of the Star of Hornbill Sarawak
Members of the Dewan Negara
Members of the Dewan Rakyat
Grand Commanders of the Order of Loyalty to the Crown of Malaysia
Commanders of the Order of the Defender of the Realm
Malaysian expatriates in the United Kingdom
Grand Commanders of the Order of Kinabalu